Raphaël Anaba (born 8 March 2000) is a Cameroonian professional footballer who plays as a left-back.

Career
Anaba made his professional Fortuna Liga debut for Senica in a match against Slovan Bratislava on 12 February 2022.

References

External links
 FK Senica official club profile 
 
 Futbalnet profile 
 

2000 births
Living people
Footballers from Yaoundé
Cameroonian footballers
Association football defenders
Olympique Lyonnais players
FK Senica players
Championnat National 2 players
Slovak Super Liga players
Cameroonian expatriate footballers
Expatriate footballers in France
Expatriate footballers in Slovakia
Cameroonian expatriate sportspeople in France
Cameroonian expatriate sportspeople in Slovakia